Monique Annette van de Elzen (born 17 July 1967) is a former association football player who represented New Zealand at international level.

Van de Elzen scored a hat-trick on her Football Ferns debut in a 3–0 win over a Hawaii X1 12 December 1987 and ended her international career with 20 caps and 11 goals to her credit.

Van de Elzen represented New Zealand at the Women's World Cup finals in China in 1991 playing all 3 group games; a 0–3 loss to Denmark, a 0–4 loss to Norway and a 1–4 loss to China.

References

External links

1967 births
Living people
New Zealand women's international footballers
New Zealand women's association footballers
1991 FIFA Women's World Cup players
New Zealand people of Dutch descent
Women's association football midfielders